Speed Pop is the second album by Japanese rock band Glay. It is the band's major label debut album, was released on March 3, 1995 and peaked at #8 at Oricon charts, with 320,150 copies sold.

Overview
Former drummer Akira appears on tracks 9 and 10, which originally appeared on their debut album along with "Rain". Masami Tsuchiya and Yūji Kawashima also contributed electric guitar and synthesizer to these new versions of those two songs respectively. Masafumi Minato (Saber Tiger and Dead End) performs on tracks 3 and 7.

Track listing 
 "Speed Pop (Introduction)" - 1:20
 "Happy Swing" - 5:12
 "" - 4:29
 "" - 7:06
 "Love Slave" - 4:17
 "Regret" - 4:53
 "Innocence" - 6:16
 "Freeze My Love" - 5:33
 "" - 5:07
 "" - 6:53
 "Junk Art" - 4:34
 "Rain" - 6:45

Personnel
Masahide Sakuma - mandolin, saxophone, trumpet, recorder, organ, acoustic piano, synthesizer, electric and acoustic guitar (2-8, 11), string arrangements (1-11), computer programming (1-11)
Soul Toul - drums (tracks 2, 4-6, 8, 11)
Masafumi Minato - drums (3 & 7)
Akira - drums (9 & 10)
Mike Baird - drums (12)
Yūji Kawashima - synthesizer (9 & 10)
Masami Tsuchiya - electric guitar (9 & 10)
Yoshiki - piano & string arrangements (12)

References 
 Speed Pop page at Oricon

External links 
 Glay Official Site

1995 albums
Glay albums